Pavel Atanasov Patev (1889-22 March 1950) was a Bulgarian zoologist known for his work in ornithology and as the director of the Sofia Zoo. He wrote a major monograph on the Birds of Bulgaria (1950).

Patev was born in Plovdiv, Bulgaria. Patev served as director of the Sofia Zoo from 1934 till the end of his life. The fossil crossbill Loxia patevi was named after him by Zlatozar Boev.

References

20th-century Bulgarian zoologists
1889 births
1950 deaths